Anna Viktorovna Petrakova-Parker (born 4 December 1984) is a Russian professional basketball player. She was part of the Russia women's national basketball team that placed fourth at the 2012 Summer Olympics. She won the 2011–12 EuroCup Women with Dynamo Kursk and the 2012–13 EuroLeague Women and the 2013 FIBA Europe SuperCup Women with UMMC Ekaterinburg.

Personal life 

Petrakova married WNBA player Candace Parker in 2019. Their son, Airr Larry Petrakov Parker, was born in February 2022.

References

1984 births
Living people
Russian women's basketball players
Olympic basketball players of Russia
Basketball players at the 2012 Summer Olympics
Sportspeople from Budapest
LGBT basketball players